Arida is a genus of flowering plants in the daisy family, Asteraceae.

 Species
The genus is native to the southwestern United States and northwestern Mexico.
 Arida arizonica (R.C.Jacks. & R.R.Johnson) D.R.Morgan & R.L.Hartm. - California Arizona Nevada, Sonora
 Arida blepharophylla (A.Gray) D.R.Morgan & R.L.Hartm.	- Texas New Mexico Chihuahua
 Arida mattturneri B.L.Turner & G.L.Nesom - Texas 
 Arida parviflora (A.Gray) D.R.Morgan & R.L.Hartm. - Arizona New Mexico Texas Colorado Utah Chihuahua, Coahuila
 Arida riparia (Kunth) D.R.Morgan & R.L.Hartm.	 - Arizona New Mexico Sonora Chihuahua, Coahuila, Durango, Zacatecas, Guanajuato
 Arida turneri (M.L.Arnold & R.C.Jacks.) D.R.Morgan & R.L.Hartm. - Chihuahua, Coahuila

 formerly included
now considered as being in Machaeranthera 
 Arida carnosa (A.Gray) D.R.Morgan & R.L.Hartm., Synonym of Machaeranthera carnosa (A.Gray) G.L.Nesom
 Arida coulteri (A.Gray) D.R.Morgan & R.L.Hartm., Synonym of Machaeranthera coulteri (A.Gray) B.L.Turner & D.B.Horne
 Arida crispa (Brandegee) D.R.Morgan & R.L.Hartm., Synonym of Machaeranthera crispa (Brandegee) B.L.Turner & D.B.Horne

References

Astereae
Asteraceae genera
Flora of North America